Splatter University is a 1982 American slasher film directed by Richard W. Haines. It was distributed by Troma Entertainment.

Plot
A patient escapes from a mental hospital, killing one of his keepers and stealing his uniform. Three years later, a teacher works late and gets stabbed and killed by the same patient after making his way to the local college. Next semester, the late professor's replacement and a new group of students have to deal with a new batch of killings.

Cast
 Forbes Riley (as Francine Forbes) as Julie Parker
 Ric Randig as Mark Hammond
 Dick Biel as Father Janson
 Kathy LaCommare as Kathy Lacommare
 Laura Gold as Cynthia

Production

The original version of the movie was shot in 1981, and it clocked in at around 65 minutes. 13 minutes of additional scenes with students were filmed the next year to increase the running time.

The filmmakers were originally told they would have two weeks to shoot at Mercy College, but the school cut their time by a week, so many members of the crew wound up sleeping in the classrooms to ensure the film was finished. When students returned to school, they were alarmed to find crew members cleaning up fake blood.

Critical reception 

AllMovie criticized the film for its "bone-headed plotting" and "half-hearted execution". In its review, Horror DNA said the film is "pretty forgettable except for a surprise twist ending that still holds up well today".

References

External links 
 

Troma Entertainment films
American slasher films
1980s teen horror films
1984 independent films
1980s serial killer films
1980s slasher films
American teen horror films
1984 films
1984 horror films
1980s English-language films
1980s American films